The BeoCenter 9500 is an integrated home music system by Bang & Olufsen. It consists of an AM/FM receiver, CD player and cassette recorder. Its features a mirrored exterior of polished aluminium and smoked glass. The BeoCenter 9500 has no buttons: it is controlled by touching the glass with a fingertip.

History
The BeoCenter 9500 was introduced in 1989 as the successor to the BeoCenter 9000 and sold until 1994 when it was replaced by its successor the BeoCenter 9300.

Controls
The BeoCenter 9500 featured B&O's unique sensi-touch control which works through a condenser effect. A graphite area is printed on the underside of the glass panel, and charged with a high frequency current. The proximity of a finger will invoke the control. The controls are illuminated by LEDs. Only the controls which have a function to the current activity are lit up.
The CD and cassette are hidden behind polished aluminium lids. A light touch on the display panel makes the lids glide to the side giving immediate access to disc or cassette.

Award
Its designer  David Lewis was awarded the iF product design award in 1990 for the BeoCenter 9500
 although the original design (the BeoCenter 9000) was by his predecessor Jacob Jensen.

See also
 Bang & Olufsen

References

External links 
 Bang & Olufsen – Manufacturer's company website
 BeoWorld – A collector's website with photos of B&O products throughout the decades
 BeoCentral – A reference site containing descriptions and photos of B&O equipment

Bang & Olufsen
Danish design